Scopula asthena is a moth of the family Geometridae. It was described by Hiroshi Inoue in 1943. It is found in Japan, north-eastern China and south-eastern Russia.

References

Moths described in 1943
asthena
Moths of Japan
Moths of Asia
Taxa named by Hiroshi Inoue